Ionia is the largest city in, and the county seat of, Ionia County, Michigan, United States.  The population was 13,378 at the 2020 census. Every July it hosts what is said to be the world's largest free-admission fair. The city is mostly within Ionia Township, with small portion extending into Easton Township and Berlin Township, but is politically autonomous of the townships.

History
Before Euro-American migration, this was the location of an Odawa village. The leader of the Odawa here was Cobmoosa. His people planted crops here in 1833 but when Dexter and his associates arrived, they sold these crops to Dexter and relocated to the Flat River. In the 1850s, they were relocated to Oceana County.

First Euro-American settlers in 1833 by settlers from New York led by Samuel Dexter Jr.
Platted in 1841
Incorporated as a village in 1865
Organized into a city in 1873

Geography
Ionia is between Michigan's capital, Lansing, and its second largest city, Grand Rapids.

Climate
This climatic region is typified by large seasonal temperature differences, with warm to hot (and often humid) summers and cold (sometimes severely cold) winters. This region is also prone to dense and heavy fog, along with flooding (sometimes very damaging) due to the Grand River that flows through the city, during the spring. According to the Köppen Climate Classification system, Ionia has a humid continental climate, abbreviated "Dfb" on climate maps.

Demographics

2010 census
As of the census of 2010, there were 11,394 people, 2,428 households, and 1,520 families living in the city. The racial makeup of the city was 70.9% White, 25.0% African American, 0.7% Native American, 0.4% Asian, 1.6% from other races, and 1.4% from two or more races. Hispanic or Latino of any race were 7.7% of the population.

There were 2,428 households, of which 37.5% had children under the age of 18 living with them, 38.9% were married couples living together, 17.8% had a female householder with no husband present, 5.9% had a male householder with no wife present, and 37.4% were non-families. 30.6% of all households were made up of individuals, and 10.5% had someone living alone who was 65 years of age or older. The average household size was 2.53 and the average family size was 3.12.

The median age in the city was 32.3 years. 15.7% of residents were under the age of 18; 16.7% were between the ages of 18 and 24; 39.4% were from 25 to 44; 21.8% were from 45 to 64; and 6.4% were 65 years of age or older. The gender makeup of the city was 71.1% male and 28.9% female.

5,230 of Ionia's 11,394 residents (45.9%) are institutionalized in the state's various correctional facilities in the city.

2000 census
As of the census of 2000, there were 10,569 people, 2,421 households, and 1,534 families living in the city. The racial makeup of the city was 71.08% White, 21.94% African American, 1.05% Native American, 0.65% Asian, 2.13% from other races, and 3.15% from two or more races. Hispanic or Latino of any race were 5.08% of the population.

There were 2,421 households, out of which 37.2% had children under the age of 18 living with them, 43.6% were married couples living together, 15.0% had a female householder with no husband present, and 36.6% were non-families. 30.7% of all households were made up of individuals, and 11.5% had someone living alone who was 65 years of age or older. The average household size was 2.53 and the average family size was 3.16.

In the city, the population was spread out, with 18.5% under the age of 18, 26.8% from 18 to 24, 34.1% from 25 to 44, 13.5% from 45 to 64, and 7.2% who were 65 years of age or older. The median age was 26 years. For every 100 females, there were 213.8 males. For every 100 females age 18 and over, there were 260.8 males.

The median income for a household in the city was $38,289, and the median income for a family was $45,794. Males had a median income of $30,373 versus $22,332 for females. The per capita income for the city was $12,157. About 13.3% of families and 15.8% of the population were below the poverty line, including 22.0% of those under age 18 and 7.5% of those age 65 or over.

Economy
Ionia Correctional Facility and the Michigan Reformatory are major employers in Ionia. Both are located to the west of downtown along Bluewater Highway and Main Street, respectively.

Government
The city levies an income tax of 1 percent on residents and 0.5 percent on nonresidents.

Major highways

Notable people
 Frances E. Burns (1866–1937), social leader and business woman
 Nick Bussell, a former Indy Pro Series race car driver
 Fred W. Green, the only Governor (1927–1931) to be elected from Ionia.
 Elizabeth Lennox (1894–1992), contralto singer, born in Ionia
 Allen B. Morse, Michigan politician, jurist, and mayor of Ionia
 Billy Strings, Grammy Award Winning Bluegrass musician, attended Ionia public school

See also
 Independent Bank

References

External links

 Official Website of the City of Ionia
Official website of the Ionia County Historical Society

Cities in Ionia County, Michigan
County seats in Michigan
Grand Rapids metropolitan area
1865 establishments in Michigan
Superfund sites in Michigan